Palmerston Park is a park in Dartry, a suburb of Dublin, Ireland.

The park is situated at the top of Palmerston Road. It is split into two sections, the east section consisting of open grass areas with a path around leading to a playground, the west section being more enclosed with a pond, flower beds and numerous routes to walk.

The park has opening and closing times that vary throughout the year. These times are displayed on the gates to the park.

References

Dartry